Summer in Bethlehem is a 1998 Indian Malayalam-language romantic comedy film directed by Sibi Malayil and written by Ranjith. It was produced by Siyad Koker under the company Kokers Films. The film stars  Suresh Gopi, Jayaram, Manju Warrier and Kalabhavan Mani while Mohanlal makes a cameo appearance. The music was composed by Vidyasagar. It tells the story of Ravishankar (Jayaram), the bumbling friend of a successful landowner Dennis ( 
Suresh Gopi), and the vacation visit by Ravishankar's relatives in Dennis's estate known as Bethlehem Estates in a fictional town of Chandragiri in the Nilgiris.

The film was released on 4 September 1998.The film was partially remade in Tamil as Lesa Lesa (2003), directed by Priyadarshan who opined that the movie was inspired by the two American movies - Fiddler on the Roof and Come September. A sequel to the film has been announced by Siyad Koker during the audio launch of the Malayalam film Meri Awas Suno.

Plot
Ravishankar, an unsuccessful investor, stays with Dennis, his friend who is successful in dairy farm business. Dennis owns a vast farmland named Bethlehem, and hundreds of cattle, in a valley. Ravi is a fun-loving, jovial chap, who has fabricated stories of his success to his parents, grandparents and relatives.

On a vacation, Colonel C.R. Menon, his grandfather and grandmother arrive with their extended family to spend a couple of days at the farmhouse of Ravishankar. He successfully makes them believe that he is the real owner of Bethlehem, and Dennis is just his working partner. Dennis, who is an orphan, was happy to meet a huge family and welcomes them with full heart. Colonel Menon has a plan to get Ravishankar married to any one of his granddaughters. Ravishankar is a bit confused about whom he should choose. To make matters complicated, he had been receiving gifts and messages from one of the five girls expressing her love for him. Meanwhile, a few days after their arrival at Bethlehem, Abhirami, another granddaughter of Menon, who is studying in Bangalore arrives alone. She seems to be too upset and worried. But within short time, she returns to normalcy and enjoys the colors of vacation. During their stay, Ravi and Dennis decide to discover the girl who had been teasing them with the cryptic messages.

Dennis begins suspecting Abhirami of being the sender but she informs him that she is not and that she would help them in finding the person. She asks around among her cousins but everyone denies them being the sender. However, Dennis begins to fall for her and to make matters complicated, Ravi confesses to him that he plans on proposing to Abhirami. To avoid a situation, Dennis hides his true feelings from everyone.

Colonel Menon and his wife approve of Ravi's and Abhirami's relationship but upon knowing this, Abhirami snubs them by declaring that she is in love with Dennis. Her decision creates a panic among all, who believes that Dennis is a failed businessman who is living at the expense of Ravishankar. Ravi shocks everyone by revealing that Dennis is the actual owner of Bethlehem and that he is more than happy to see Abhirami marrying Dennis. Abhirami meets Dennis who is completely broken down after the chaos at the house. Dennis, at the same time, is happy at heart knowing about Abhirami's love for him. But she shocks him by saying that she was just using his name to escape the marriage. She tells Dennis that she is in love with Niranjan, a Naxal revolutionary in southern Karnataka. Niranjan, whom she met in Bangalore, is now in jail, convicted of killing Brijesh Mallaya, a business owner and his family. He is awaiting his death sentence in a couple of days and Abhirami has taken a vow not to marry anyone other than Niranjan.

But at home, upon the compulsion from Ravi, the family decides to get Abhirami married to Dennis. The night before wedding, Abhirami requests Dennis to take her to jail to meet Niranjan for one last time. They meet Niranjan, who is a completely changed man. Remorseful Niranjan regrets the violent ways he adopted in class war and the crimes he did to obtain a classless society. Niranjan advises Abhirami to forget him and accept Dennis as her husband. Abhirami refuses to take his words, but Niranjan forces Dennis to tie the thali to Abhirami, which she has brought with her. Dennis obeys Niranjan, marries Abhirami at the jail, and Niranjan witnesses it with tearful eyes.

A few days later, the family returns home, while Ravi jokingly reminds everyone that they should be back here next year to welcome junior Dennis. The train departs slowly and a girl's hand reaches out of the coach window, holding the kitten which was sent as a gift to Ravi before. Ravi takes off running to find out who it is, but he catches only a cryptic message that teases him to follow and discover her identity.

Cast

 Suresh Gopi as Dennis
 Jayaram as Ravishankar
 Manju Warrier as Abhirami (Amy)
 Sangeetha as Jyothi (Ravishankar's unknown lover) 
 Sreejaya Nair as Devika
 Mayoori as Gayathri
 Manjula as Aparna
 Kalabhavan Mani as Monayi
 Janardhanan as Rtd. Colonel C. R. Menon, Ravishankar's grandfather
 Sukumari as Ravishankar's grandmother
 V. K. Sreeraman as Balachandran, Abhirami's adopted father
 Reena as Abhirami's adopted mother
 Girija Preman as Ravishankar's mother 
 Augustine as Appunni Nair
 Sadiq as Chandrappan, Police officer
 Sujitha as Ravishankar's cousin sister
 Dhanya Menon as Ravishankar's cousin sister
 Nivia Rebin as Ravishankar's cousin sister
 Krupa as Ravishankar's cousin sister
 M. Renjith as Lawrence
 Kalabhavan Rahman as courier agent
 Mohanlal as Niranjan (Guest appearance)

Production
The movie, Summer in Bethlehem was the second script written by Renjith for Sibi Malayil after Maya Mayooram.

In 2018, Sibi revealed the film was originally in Tamil with Prabhu as male lead along with Manju Warrier and Jayaram however producer back out of the film after argument, until Siyad Kokker convinced Sibi to film will made in Malayalam, Suresh Gopi replaced Prabhu as lead while Warrier and Jayaram retained their roles

Soundtrack

The soundtrack of the film was composed by Vidyasagar and written by Gireesh Puthenchery. The soundtrack had seven songs. The soundtrack became one of the biggest hits in Kerala. Vidyasagar won Filmfare Award for Best Music Director for this film.

Release
The film was released alongside the Mammootty and Mohanlal starrer- Harikrishnans and Dileep starrer Punjabi House.

Reception
Jayalakshmi K. of Deccan Herald said that "A fun and family entertainer, even if dragging at times. There are songs, catchy tunes, dances with glamorous settings and backdrops, and a beautiful location which may set you on the trail of this Bethlehem in humara Bharat".

Box office
The film was commercial success and third highest grossing Malayalam film of the year 1998.

Controversy 
Producer of the film Siyad Koker accused Priyadarshan of remaking Summer in Bethlehem in Tamil without taking permission or purchasing the right. The Kerala Film Producers Association had banned the screening of all the films of Priyadarsan in the state at the time. Kokker alleged that Priyadarshan's Tamil film Lesa Lesa is an uncredited remake of Summer in Bethlehem. Priyadarsan refuted by alleging that Summer in Bethlehem itself is an uncredited remake of American films Fiddler on the Roof and Come September. The matter was later settled, with Priyadarshan paying ₹ 8 Lakhs to Siyad and ₹ 3 Lakhs each to Ranjith and Sibi Malayil.

References

External links
 
 Summer in Bethlehem at Oneindia.in

Films shot in Ooty
1998 romantic comedy films
1998 films
1990s Malayalam-language films
Malayalam films remade in other languages
Indian romantic comedy films
Films directed by Sibi Malayil
Films scored by Vidyasagar
Films with screenplays by Ranjith
Films about cousins